Adding a Dimension is a collection of seventeen scientific essays by American writer and scientist Isaac Asimov.  It was the third of a series of books collecting essays from The Magazine of Fantasy and Science Fiction. It was first published by Doubleday & Company in 1964.

Contents
Part I: Mathematics
T-Formation (August 1963)
One, Ten, Buckle My Shoe (December 1962)
Varieties of the Infinite (September 1959)
A Piece of Pi (May 1960)
Tools of the Trade (September 1960)
The Imaginary that Isn't (March 1961)
Pre-Fixing It Up (November 1962)
Part II: Physics
The Rigid Vacuum (April 1963)
The Light that Failed (June 1963)
The Light Fantastic (August 1962)
Part III: Chemistry
Slow Burn (October 1962)
You, Too, Can Speak Gaelic (March 1963)
Part IV: Biology
The Lost Generation (February 1963)
He's Not My Type (January 1963)
Part V: Astronomy
The Shape of Things (September 1962)
Twinkle, Twinkle, Little Star (October 1963)
Part VI: General
The Isaac Winners (July 1963)

External links
Asimovonline.com
 Adding a Dimension at The Thunder Childv

Biology Essay Writing

Essay collections by Isaac Asimov
1964 books
Works originally published in The Magazine of Fantasy & Science Fiction
Doubleday (publisher) books
Scientific essays